The Bene Israel, also referred to as the "Shanivar Teli" or "Native Jew" caste, are a community of Jews in India. It has been suggested that they are the descendants of one of the Ten Lost Tribes via their ancestors who had settled there centuries ago. In the 19th century, after they were taught about normative (Ashkenazi and Sephardi) Judaism, they migrated from villages in the Konkan region to nearby cities throughout British India—primarily to Mumbai, but also to Pune, Ahmedabad, and Karachi (now in Pakistan), where they gained prominent positions within the British colonial government and the Indian Army.

In the early part of the 20th century, many Bene Israel became active in the Indian film industry as actresses/actors, producers, and directors. With Indian independence in 1947 followed by the Israeli Declaration of Independence in 1948, many Bene Israel, including those who had arrived in India after their exodus from newly-independent Pakistan, soon immigrated to the State of Israel, Canada and other Commonwealth countries, and the United States.

History

According to the Bene Israel tradition, they arrived in India sometime in the first or second century when their ancestors were shipwrecked in western India while on a trading voyage to the far east. On the other hand, some historians have thought their ancestors may have belonged to one of the Lost Tribes of Israel, but the Bene Israel have never been officially recognized by Jewish authorities as such. After migrating to India the Bene Israel gradually assimilated to the people around them, while keeping some Jewish customs. The medieval Jewish philosopher Maimonides mentioned in a letter that there was a Jewish community living in India: he may have been referring to the Bene Israel.

At a point in history which is uncertain, an Indian Jew from Cochin named David Rahabi discovered the Bene Israel in their villages and recognized their vestigial Jewish customs. Rahabi taught the people about normative Judaism. He trained some young men among them to be the religious preceptors of the community. Known as Kajis, these men held a position that became hereditary, similar to the Cohanim. They became recognized as judges and settlers of disputes within the community.

Bene Israel tradition places Rahabi's arrival at either 1000 or 1400, although some historians have dated his arrival to the 18th century. They suggest that the "David Rahabi" of Bene Israel folklore was a man named David Ezekiel Rahabi, who lived from 1694 to 1772, and resided in Cochin, then the center of the wealthy Malabar Jewish community. Others suggest that the reference is to David Baruch Rahabi, who arrived in Bombay from Cochin in 1825.

It is estimated that there were 6,000 Bene Israel in the 1830s; 10,000 at the turn of the 20th century; and in 1948—their peak in India—they numbered 20,000. Since that time, most of the population has immigrated to Israel. In 2020, the Jewish population in Mumbai numbered about 3,500, out of which 99% were from the Bene Israel community. Mumbai and surrounding regions like Raigad houses several Synagogues, most of which belong to the Bene Israel community.

Under British colonial rule, many Bene Israel rose to prominence in India; they were less affected by discriminatory legislation and gained prominent positions within the colonial government and the Indian Army, at a higher rate overall than their non-Jewish counterparts. Some of these enlistees with their families later immigrated to the British protectorate of Aden. In the 19th century, the Bene Israel did however meet with hostility from the newly anglicized Baghdadi Jews who considered the Bene Israel to be "Indian". They also questioned the Jewishness of the community. In response, the Bene Israel educator and historian, Haeem Samuel Kehimkar, spearheaded the defence of the Jewishness of the Bene Israel in the late 1800s. In his writings, he tried to portray the Bene Israel as a totally foreign community in India. He also divided the community into two endogamous groups, white (gora) and black (kala). He claimed the whites had pure blood and the blacks were the progeny of Indian women and therefore impure.

In the early twentieth century, numerous Bene Israel became leaders in the new film industry in India. In addition, men worked as producers and actors: Ezra Mir (alias Edwin Myers) (1903-1993) became the first chief of Films Division of India, and Solomon Moses was head of the Bombay Film Lab Pvt Ltd from the 1940s to 1990s. Ennoch Isaac Satamkar was a film actor and assistant director to Mehboob Khan, a director of Hindi films.

Given the relatively privileged position they had held under British colonial rule, many Bene Israel prepared to leave India at independence in 1947. They believed that nationalism and the emphasis on indigenous religions would mean fewer opportunities for them. Most immigrated to the State of Israel, which was newly established in 1948 as a Jewish homeland.

Gallery

Life in Israel

Between 1948 and 1952, some 2,300 Bene Israel immigrated to Israel. In India, the Bene Israel and other Jews lived in urban areas, however in Israel they were settled into development towns. Members of the Bene Israel faced discrimination from other Jewish groups, including due to their darker skin colour. Several rabbis refused to marry Bene Israel to other Jews, on grounds that they were not legitimate Jews under Orthodox law. Between 1952 and 1954, following sit-down protests and hunger strikes by Bene Israel demanding to be sent back to India, the Jewish Agency repatriated 337 members of the Bene Israel community to India, though most eventually returned to Israel years later.

In 1962, authorities in Israel were accused of racism towards the Bene Israel. In the case that caused the controversy, the Chief Rabbi of Israel ruled that before registering a marriage between Indian Jews and Jews not belonging to that community, the registering rabbi should investigate the lineage of the Indian applicant for possible non-Jewish descent, and in case of doubt, require the applicant to perform conversion or immersion. The discrimination may actually be related to the fact that some religious authorities believed that the Bene Israel were not fully Jewish because of inter-marriage during their long separation. Between 1962 and 1964, the Bene Israel community staged protests against the religious policy. In 1964 the Israeli Rabbinate ruled that the Bene Israel are "full Jews in every respect".

The Report of the High Level Commission on the Indian Diaspora (2012) reviewed life in Israel for the Bene Israel community. It noted that the city of Beersheba in Southern Israel has the largest community of Bene Israel, with a sizable one in Ramla. They have a new kind of transnational family. Generally the Bene Israel have not been politically active and have been of modest means. They have not formed continuing economic connections to India and have limited political status in Israel. Jews of Indian origin are generally regarded as Sephardic; they have become well integrated religiously with the Sephardhim community in Israel. Abbink, on the other hand, states that the Bene Israel have become a distinct ethnic minority in Israel. The community despite being in Israel for many generations has maintained many of their traditions from India such as Malida (ritual offerings) and wedding rituals such as mehndi. The prophet Elijah has become a kind of patron saint for Bene Israel. A ritual of thanksgiving dedicated to the Prophet Elijah is called Eliahu HaNabi, and is performed at weddings and other celebratory events. The ceremony features a tray of malida, parched rice, grated coconut, fruits, nuts and sugar. The ceremony is regarded as a boundary marker between the Bene Israel and other Jewish communities. The Community also observes Tashlich, the ceremony of taking a ritual bath at Rosh Hashanah. The Bene Israel also like to attend their own synagogues to maintain group life. This is also seen in higher levels of endogamy compared to other Jewish groups.

Religiously, the Bene Israel adopted the devotional singing style Kirtan from their Marathi Hindu neighbors. A popular Kirtan is one based on the Story of Joseph. Their main traditional musical instruments are the Indian Harmonium and the Bulbul tarang.

The Central Organisation of Indian Jews in Israel (COIJI) was founded by Noah Massil. The organization has twenty chapters around Israel. Maiboli, the newsletter for the Bene Israel community is edited by Noah Masil. There is also a website called Indian Jewish Community in Israel which coordinates various cultural activities organized by the community. The community in Israel opened the museum of Indian Jewish Heritage in the town of Dimona in 2012. The museum is currently run by volunteers. At present, the museum has a small collection of items donated by the community. It also holds cultural and cooking classes for all communities.

Migration to other countries
Members of Bene Israel also settled in Britain, and North America, mostly in Canada.

Notable people
 Reuben Dhondji Ashtumkar (1820–after 1877), Indian soldier who fought in the Indian Rebellion of 1857
 Joseph Ezekiel Rajpurkar (1834–1905), Indian writer and translator of Hebrew liturgical works into Marathi
 Jerusha Jhirad (1890–1984), the first female Indian Jewish physician and a distinguished gynaecologist
 Ezra Mir alias Edwin Myers (1903–1993), producer, the first chief of India's Film Division, called the Information Films of India under British rule; noted in the Guinness Book of World Records as "the producer of the largest number of documentaries and short films".
 David Abraham Cheulkar (1908–1982), actor in India better known as David, he starred in Boot Polish (1954) and sang (on screen) "Nanhe Munne Bachche"
 Firoza Begum (born as Susan Solomon), Indian actor in the 1920s and 1930s
 Reuben David (1912–89), zoologist, founder of Kankaria Zoo, Ahmedabad, Gujarat, father of Esther David
 Benjamin Abraham Samson (1916–2008), Indian Navy Admiral, father of Leela Samson
 Lila Erulkar (1921–2007), First Lady of Cyprus (1993–2003) and wife of Glafcos Clerides, president of the Republic of Cyprus
 Nissim Ezekiel (1924–2004), Indian poet
 Fleur Ezekiel, model and former Miss World India
 Ralph Sam Haeems (1940–2005), Indian-born British criminal defence solicitor
 Esther David (1945–), Indian writer and critic, daughter of Reuben David
 Leela Samson (1951–), Indian dancer, choreographer, and actress; daughter of Benjamin Abraham Samson
 Isaac David Kehimkar (1957–), Indian lepidopterist, butterfly expert based in Navi Mumbai
 Liora Itzhak Pezarkar (1974–), Israeli singer of Indian origin, sung the Hatikvah and Jana Gana Mana – the national anthem of Israel and India respectively during Prime Minister Narendra Modi's 2017 visit to Israel
 Eban Hyams (1981–), Indian-born Australian professional basketball player
 Bensiyon Songavkar (1985–), Indian cricket, silver medalist at the 2009 Maccabiah Games
 Samson Kehimkar, Indian musician
 Ezekiel Isaac Malekar, Indian rabbi

See also
 Judaism in India
 Satamkar
 Synagogues in India
 Jews of Pakistan

References

Further reading

 David, Esther. The Book of Esther, Penguin Global, 2003
 Isenberg, Shirley Berry. India's Bene Israel: A Comprehensive Inquiry and Sourcebook, Berkeley: Judah L. Magnes Museum, 1988
 
 Meera Jacob. Shulamith (1975)
 Parfitt, Tudor. (1987) The Thirteenth Gate: Travels among the Lost Tribes of Israel, London: Weidenfeld & Nicolson.
 Shepard, Sadia. The Girl from Foreign: A Search for Shipwrecked Ancestors, Forgotten Histories, and a Sense of Home, Penguin Press, 2008

External links

 Joseph Jacobs and Joseph Ezekiel, "Beni-Israel", Jewish Encyclopedia (1901–1906).
 "Interview with Sadia Shepard", Voices on Antisemitism, United States Holocaust Memorial Museum, 4 June 2009.
 "Bene Israel", Photo Gallery & Forum, Jews of India.
 September 2005, The Fletcher School of Law and Diplomacy, Tufts University.
 "The Indian Jewish community and synagogues in Israel", India Jews.
 "Yonati Ziv Yifatech", Bene Israel wedding hymn.
 Bene Israel History.
 The History of the Bene-Israel in India , by Haeem Samuel Kahimkar (1830-1909).
 The Bene Israel: A Family Portrait (1994), an Indian documentary film on the Bene Israel.

 
Indian Jews
Social groups of Maharashtra
Groups claiming Israelite descent
Jewish ethnic groups